Larry Alan Wasserman (born 1959) is a Canadian-American statistician and a professor in the Department of Statistics & Data Science and the Machine Learning Department at Carnegie Mellon University.

Biography
Wasserman received his Ph.D. from the University of Toronto in 1988 under the supervision of Robert Tibshirani.

He received the COPSS Presidents' Award in 1999 and the CRM-SSC Prize in 2002.

He was elected a fellow of the American Statistical Association in 1996, of the Institute of Mathematical Statistics in 2004, and of the American Association for the Advancement of Science in 2011. He was elected to National Academy of Sciences in May, 2016.

Selected works
Wasserman has  written many research papers about nonparametric inference, asymptotic theory, causality, and applications of statistics to astrophysics, bioinformatics, and genetics. He has also written two advanced statistics textbooks, All of Statistics and All of Nonparametric Statistics.

 2004. All of Statistics: A Concise Course in Statistical Inference. Springer-Verlag, New York. 
 won DeGroot Prize 2005. 
 2006. All of Nonparametric Statistics. Springer. 
 2013. Topological Inference. Reitz Lecture 2013.

Honors and awards
 2016, Member of National Academy of Sciences
 Wasserman was elected to National Academy of Sciences in recognition of his distinguished and continuing achievement in original research.

See also
 Peer review
 Computational thinking

References

External links 
Wasserman's home page
 Wasserman's Blog on Statistics and Machine Learning

Canadian statisticians
Fellows of the Institute of Mathematical Statistics
Fellows of the American Statistical Association
Members of the United States National Academy of Sciences
Carnegie Mellon University faculty
Living people
University of Toronto alumni
Scientists from Ontario
21st-century Canadian mathematicians
1959 births
Mathematical statisticians